The Grammy Award for Best Arrangement, Instruments and Vocals (including its previous names) has been awarded since 1963. The award is presented to the arranger of the music, not to the performer(s), except if the performer is also the arranger.

There have been several minor changes to the name of the award:

 From 1963 to 1964 the award was known as Best Background Arrangement
 In 1965 it was awarded as Best Accompaniment Arrangement for Vocalist(s) or Instrumentalist(s)
 From 1966 to 1967 it was awarded as Best Arrangement Accompanying a Vocalist or Instrumentalist
 In 1968 it was awarded as Best Instrumental Arrangement Accompanying Vocalist(s)/Best Background Arrangement
 From 1969 to 1978 and in 1981 it was awarded as Best Arrangement Accompanying Vocalist(s)
 From 1979 to 1980 it was awarded as Best Arrangement Accompanying Vocal(s)
 From 1982 to 1994 and from 1998 to 1999 it was awarded as Best Instrumental Arrangement Accompanying Vocal(s)
 From 1995 to 1997 it was awarded as Best Instrumental Arrangement with Accompanying Vocals
 From 2000 to 2014 it was awarded as Best Instrumental Arrangement Accompanying Vocalist(s)
 Since 2015, it has been awarded as Best Arrangement, Instruments And Vocals, which also includes vocal arrangements.

Years reflect the year in which the Grammy Awards were presented, for works released in the previous year.

Recipients

References

Instrumental Arrangement Accompanying Vocalist